Gessius, Gessios, Gesios or Gesius may refer to:

Gessius, a genus of leafoppers
Gessius Florus, Roman procurator of Judea (64–66)
Gessius (praetorian prefect) (floruit 420–443), Roman official
Gessius of Petra (floruit 480s–530s), physician